Dallas Raymond McKennon (July 19, 1919 – July 14, 2009), sometimes credited as Dal McKennon, was an American film, television and voice actor, who had a career lasting over 50 years. During World War II he served in the Army Signal Corps and was stationed in Alaska.

Career

Born near La Grande, Oregon, McKennon's best-known voice roles were Gumby for Art Clokey, Archie Andrews in several different Archie series for Filmation, and the primary voice of Buzz Buzzard in the Woody Woodpecker cartoons. In the early 1950s, McKennon created and hosted his own daily kids TV wraparound show, Space Funnies/Capt. Jet, which was aired weekday mornings on KNXT (KCBS-TV) TV Ch. 2 in Los Angeles. It was the first Los Angeles-based kids show to air reruns of The Little Rascals and Laurel & Hardy shorts. He was also the primary voice actor for the 1960 cartoon series Q.T. Hush. McKennon was also the voice of the Hardy Boys' sidekick, Chet Morton, in the 1969 animated mystery series.

McKennon also sang and provided many character voices, mainly for Walt Disney Animation. He voiced characters in Lady and the Tramp, Sleeping Beauty, One Hundred and One Dalmatians, Mary Poppins, and Bedknobs and Broomsticks; his laughter as a hyena in Lady and the Tramp was later recycled as a stock sound effect for the voice of Ripper Roo in the Crash Bandicoot video game series. He also provided the voices for many Disney attractions such as the Big Thunder Mountain Railroad safety announcement, a pair of laughing hyenas in the Africa Room portion of It's a Small World, Benjamin Franklin's voice in Epcot's The American Adventure, Epcot's WorldKey information kiosks, and Zeke in the Country Bear Jamboree.

McKennon's best-known live action role is the innkeeper Cincinnatus in Daniel Boone. He also had a bit part as a diner cook in The Birds and as a gas station attendant in Clambake. His final movie was Gumby: The Movie under the pseudonym Charles Farrington. He voiced Gumby, Fatbuckle, Lucky Claybert, and Professor Kapp.

McKennon was an avid Oregon Trail historian. He visited schools around the Northwest lecturing children about Oregon history and worked at the Oregon Trail Interpretive Center giving instructional speeches, and put together plays, skits, songs, stories, and informational documents leading up to the Oregon Trail's sesquicentennial (150th anniversary).

He also worked with Oregon Public Broadcasting creating The Pappenheimers, an instructional video series to help teach children German. His character lived in a Volkswagen Type 2 and would tell stories about relatives in Germany.

Personal life
In 1942, McKennon married his childhood love interest, Betty Warner, in Portland, Oregon. The couple had six daughters and two sons. They lived in California until 1968, when they moved to Cannon Beach, Oregon, from where McKennon commuted for voice acting and voiceover roles.

Death
McKennon died from natural causes on July 14, 2009, at the Willapa Harbor Care Center in Raymond, Washington, five days before his 90th birthday.

Filmography

Live-action

Bend of the River (1952) – Miner (uncredited)
Tom Thumb (1959) – Carpenter (uncredited)
The Tingler (1959) – Projectionist (uncredited)
Have Rocket, Will Travel (1959, TV Series) – The Unicorn (voice, uncredited)
Let No Man Write My Epitaph (1960) – Court Clerk (uncredited)
Wagon Train (1960) – Hotel Clerk Kelly
The Silent Call (1961) – Old Man
Twist Around the Clock (1961) – Motel Proprietor (uncredited)
Gunsmoke (1961-1962) – Jake / Homesteader
Womanhunt (1962)
Ben Casey (1962, TV Series) – Waco Martin
Son of Flubber (1963) – 1st Juror (uncredited)
Mr. Smith Goes to Washington (1963, TV Series) – Jim Tolliver
The Birds (1963) – Sam, the Cook (uncredited)
House of the Damned (1963) – Mr. Quinby 
Twilight of Honor (1963) – Mr. Phillips (uncredited)
The Wheeler Dealers (1963) – Sea Captain / Prissy Hotel Clerk (uncredited)
My Favorite Martian (1963, TV Series) – Mailman
The Misadventures of Merlin Jones (1964) – Detective Hutchins
A Tiger Walks (1964) – Reporter (uncredited)
7 Faces of Dr. Lao (1964) – Lean Cowboy
Mary Poppins (1964) – Fox / Penguin #2 / Hunting Horse / Merry-Go-Round Operator (voice, uncredited)
Daniel Boone (1964, 80 episodes) – Cincinnatus
The Glory Guys (1965) – Karl Harpane
Bonanza (1966, TV Series) – Jenkins
The Andy Griffith Show (1967, TV Series) – Brian Jackson
Clambake (1967) – Bearded Gas Station Attendant (uncredited)
Iron Horse (1967, TV Series) – Gabe
Dundee and the Culhane (1967, TV Series) – Al
Did You Hear the One About the Traveling Saleslady? (1968) – Old Soldier
The Love God? (1969) – Bird Caller (uncredited)
The Andersonville Trial (1970, TV Movie) – First Guard
Bedknobs and Broomsticks (1971) – Bear (voice)
Cannon (1971, TV Series) – Bucky Fosdick
Emilio and His Magical Bull (1975)
Space Academy (1977, TV Series) – Johnny Sunseed
The Cat from Outer Space (1978) – Charlie Cooney
Hot Lead and Cold Feet (1978) – Saloon Man
Tourist Trap (1979) – Mask (archived recording of laugh)
Mystery Mansion (1983) – Sam
Wee Sing: King Cole's Party (1987) – Crooked Old Man
Frozen Assets (1992) – Stud of the Year Octogenarian
Elf (2003) – Jack-in-the-Box (archived recording of laugh)

Animation

Lady and the Tramp (1955) – Toughy / Pedro / Professor / Hyena
Space Funnies (1956-1957, TV Series) – Captain Jet
Hergé's Adventures of Tintin (1957, TV Series) – Tintin / Professor Calculus
Woody Woodpecker (1957-1958, Walter Lantz Series) – Buzz Buzzard
Paul Bunyan (1958, Short) – Cal McNab
Sleeping Beauty (1959) – Owl
Bucky and Pepito (1959-1960, TV Series) – Bucky and Pepito
Q. T. Hush (1960, TV Series) – Q.T. Hush / Shamus
Courageous Cat and Minute Mouse (1960-1962, TV cartoon series) – Courageous Cat
Inspector Willoughby (1960-1965, Walter Lantz series)
One Hundred and One Dalmatians (1961) – Barking Dogs
Come Out Party (1963, Short) – Inspector Willoughby
Dinbad Jr. (1965-1966, TV Series) – Dinbad Jr. / Salty
Winnie the Pooh and the Honey Tree (1966) – Bees (uncredited)
How the Grinch Stole Christmas (1966) – Max
The Gumby Show (1966-1968, TV Series) – Gumby / Pokey / Prickle / Nopey / Gumbo (only in Chicken Feed) / Henry (re-dubbed voice) / Rodgy (re-dubbed voice) / Granny
Cat and Dupli-cat (1967, Tom and Jerry short) – Jerry Mouse (singing voice)
Sissy Sheriff (1967, Short) – Sugarfoot / Dirty McNasty
Lotsa Luck (1968) – (voice)
Archie's Funhouse (1968, TV Series) – Archie Andrews / Hot Dog / Mr. Weatherbee
The Archie Show (1968, TV Series) – Archie Andrews / Hot Dog / Mr. Weatherbee
The Hardy Boys (1969, cartoon series) – Joe Hardy / Chubby Morton
Sabrina the Teenage Witch (1969-1970, TV Series) – Salem / Archie Andrews / Hot Dog / Mr. Weatherbee / Batso / Ratso
Sabrina and the Groovie Goolies (1970, TV Series) – Salem / Archie Andrews / Hot Dog / Mr. Weatherby / Rover / Batso / Ratso
Aesop's Fables (1971) – Owl / Frog / Rooster and Beaver
Daffy Duck and Porky Pig Meet the Groovie Goolies (1972) – Sylvester the Cat (meowing sounds) / Charlie Dog
Journey Back to Oz (1972) – Omby Amby
Treasure Island (1973) – Captain Flint / Ben Gunn
Oliver Twist (1974) – Bookseller / Charlie Bates
The U.S. of Archie (1974, TV Series) – Archie Andrews / Hot Dog / Mr. Weatherbee 
Pinocchio (1978) – Geppetto
The American Adventure (1982) – Benjamin Franklin / Soldier #2
The Adventures of Mark Twain (1985) – Jim Smiley
The Puppetoon Movie (1987) – Additional voices including the character Gumby.
Goof Troop (1992, TV Series) – Old Man in Bathtub
Gumby: The Movie (1995) – Gumby / Professor Kapp / Fatbuckle / Lucky Claybert / Nobuckle (credited as Charles Farrington)

Video games

Crash Bandicoot (1996) – Ripper Roo (laugh only, uncredited)
Crash Bandicoot 2: Cortex Strikes Back (1997) – Ripper Roo (laugh only, uncredited)
Darkstalkers 3 (1997) – Laugh sound effect (uncredited)
Crash Team Racing (1999) – Ripper Roo (laugh only, uncredited)
Crash Bash (2000) – Ripper Roo (laugh only, uncredited)
Disney's Magical Mirror Starring Mickey Mouse (2002) – The Ghost (laugh only, uncredited)
Grabbed by the Ghoulies (2003) – Laugh sound effect (uncredited)
LocoRoco (2006) – Stock laughter heard in the Dolangomeri level theme; reused in the sequel in the same world's level theme (uncredited)

Theme park attractions

Big Thunder Mountain Railroad – Safety spiel
Country Bear Jamboree – Zeke
The Hall of Presidents – Andrew Jackson
It's a Small World – Laughing hyenas
The American Adventure – Benjamin Franklin
The Haunted Mansion – Deaf Old Man

Albums
Donald Duck and His Friends – Scrooge McDuck
Wee Sing Nursery Rhymes and Lullabies (1985) – Narrator / Crooked old man
Wee Sing America (1987) – Various voices
Wee Sing Silly Songs (1988 re-recording) – Various voices
Wee Sing: Fun n Folk (1989) – Various voices
Wee Sing Around the Campfire (1990 re-recording) – Various voices
Wee Sing Dinosaurs (1991) – Various voices
Wee Sing Animals Animals Animals (1999) – Various voices

Centerpoint: Poetry & Music for Christmas – Featured reader

References

External links

Dallas McKennon - Daily Telegraph obituary

Dallas McKennon from The Observer (La Grande)

1919 births
2009 deaths
American male television actors
American male voice actors
Animal impersonators
Filmation people
People from La Grande, Oregon
United States Army personnel of World War II
Walt Disney Animation Studios people
Walter Lantz Productions people
20th-century American male actors